Arafat Rahman, nicknamed "Koko" (December 8, 1969 – January 24, 2015) was a Bangladeshi cricket organizer and former Chairman of the Development Committee of the Bangladesh Cricket Board. He was also the younger son of the former President of Bangladesh Ziaur Rahman and former Prime Minister of Bangladesh Khaleda Zia.

Arafat Rahman is widely remembered for his contribution to cricket in Bangladesh as the Chairman of the Development Committee of the Bangladesh Cricket Board from 2002 to 2005. He played a significant role in designing a development programme for the Bangladesh Cricket Board, initiating the High-Performance Squad that worked as the grooming ground for young cricketers and ensured a pipeline of talent for the national cricket team over the following decade.

Arafat died in Malaysia on January 24, 2015, due to cardiac arrest. He was exiled by the caretaker regime of 2007-08 after his conviction in a money laundering case which his lawyers claimed was fabricated. The funds in question were claimed by his lawyers to have been transferred by a Singaporean businessman with no obvious ties to Rahman while he was in jail in November 2007.

Early life and family
Arafat Rahman was born on 12 August 1969 in East Pakistan. He belonged to a notable Bengali Muslim political family of Mandals hailing from Bagbari in Gabtali, Bogra District. His paternal family has Iranian ancestry via his great-grandmother Meherunnisa, whose forefathers arrived in Ghoraghat during the Mughal period. His father, Ziaur Rahman, was the 7th President of Bangladesh, and his mother, Begum Khaleda Zia, was the 10th Prime Minister and first female Prime Minister of Bangladesh. His paternal grandmother, Jahanara Khatun, was the wife of Mansur Rahman, a chemist who specialised in paper and ink chemistry and worked for a government department at the Writers' Building of Calcutta.

Rahman was married to Sharmila Rahman Sithi. He was the father of two children – Zahia and Zaifa, with Sharmila Rahman. His elder brother is Tarique Rahman, who is now the Senior Vice-Chairman of the Bangladesh Nationalist Party and a member of Centrist Democrat International.

Sports organizer
Arafat Rahman was enthusiastic about sports, especially cricket which is the most popular sport in Bangladesh. During his studies in Australia, he built a network with local Australian cricket coaching staff in the early 1990s which he utilized to shape Bangladesh's cricket as the Chairman of the Development Committee of the Bangladesh Cricket Board (BCB), from 2002 to 2005.

Rahman was one of the pioneers of developing a High-Performance unit at BCB to develop emerging cricketers in an academy setting. This initiative helped develop Mohammad Ashraful, Aftab Ahmed, Shahriar Nafees, Mashrafe Mortaza, Shakib Al Hasan, Mushfiqur Rahim and many others who later became an integral part of the Bangladesh cricket team. He brought in Richard McInnes to lead the initiative. This initiative was eventually converted into the National Cricket Academy.

He is particularly credited for renovating Sher-e-Bangla National Cricket Stadium, which was originally built as a football and athletics stadium, and converting the stadium into the home of Bangladesh cricket. Despite the criticism and unverified allegations of corruption, Arafat Rahman led the renovation process of the stadium and eventually made it one of the best stadiums in South Asia, with the best drainage facility in the subcontinent. From 2004 to 2006, before being recognized as an international stadium, about three feet of soil was excavated to remove all the red clay and water pipes were fit in to develop a drainage facility, and afterward it was filled up with rock chips and sand and then grass. The gallery was replaced by new chairs and shades as well.

In his short stint with BCB, Arafat Rahman contributed to the development of six international cricket venues across the country, in Dhaka, Chattagram, Narayanganj, Sylhet, Khulna and Bogra, all of whom received international status from 2006 to 2007.

Besides, Arafat Rahman invited the country's prominent businessmen Khondokar Jamil Uddin, Aziz Al Kaiser, Reaz Uddin Al-Mamoon, and others to invest in cricket clubs and pumped in corporate financial support for the emerging cricketers. Remembering his conversation with Arafat Rahman, prominent businessman Khondokar Jamil Uddin said,

Rahman was also the chairman of Old DOHS Sports Club and helped in the development of a new sports club, City Club.

Exile and death

After the military-backed takeover of power by a technocrat government led by Dr. Fakhruddin Ahmed, Arafat Rahman's business office and house were raided by joint forces multiple times. In April 2007 he was picked up from his home to pressure his mother and the former prime minister Begum Khaleda Zia to leave Bangladesh as a part of the "Minus Two Formula". He was later released and was dropped at home after his mother was said to have agreed to leave the country with her sons.

However, in June 2007 she changed her decision to stay in Bangladesh and face the consequences. Cases soon started being filed against Arafat and his mother. By August, all of their bank accounts were frozen and by early September, Arafat and his mother Begum Khaleda Zia were sued and arrested.

On July 17, 2008, after receiving permission from the Bangladesh Supreme Court, Rahman went to Thailand and then to Malaysia for medical treatment. Later, he was jailed for six years in a case of money laundering and a Dhaka court issued a warrant for his arrest in November 2010. After that, he moved to Malaysia from Thailand and never returned to Bangladesh.

He died of cardiac arrest on January 24, 2015, at University Malaya Medical Center (UMMC), Kuala Lumpur, Malaysia.

He was buried at Banani Graveyard in Bangladesh on January 27, 2015, after a grand funeral which was attended by thousands of mourners in Dhaka.

References

1969 births
2015 deaths
Bangladeshi businesspeople
Children of national leaders
Burials at Banani Graveyard
Ziaur Rahman
Place of birth missing
Bangladeshi people of Middle Eastern descent
People from Bogra District
Majumder–Zia family